Ode for St Cecilia's Day are odes for St Cecilia the patron saint of music and may refer to musical works by:
 Henry Purcell
 Welcome to all the pleasures
Hail! Bright Cecilia  
George Frederic Handel 
Ode for St. Cecilia's Day, setting a poem by John Dryden